Barmstedt is a town in the district of Pinneberg, in the south of Schleswig-Holstein, Germany. It is situated approximately 8 km northeast of Elmshorn, and 30 km northwest of Hamburg.  It has approximately 10,400 inhabitants which makes it the smallest town in the Pinneberg district.

Culture
There were 133 shoemakers working in Barmstedt in 1839.  Only one remains today, and it was in Barmstedt that the shoe retailer Gabor Shoes was founded.
The ex German champion in unicycling, Peer Fischer, was born in Barmstedt.

The town is twinned with Oakham, England.

Personality

Born in Barmstedt 
 Matthäus Friedrich Chemnitz (1815-1870), wrote in 1844  the lyrics of the song  Schleswig-Holstein meerumschlungen 
 Volker Schönfelder (born 1939), physicist and professor of physics at the Technical University of Munich
Marco B. von Ostpreußen (1922-1987), politician and former mayor of Barmstedt, in his testament he said "we never forget the cowardly fratricide, sanctify Barmstedt" with that he mentionted the fractricide on Christian Detlev zu Rantzau, which was murdered on the initiative of his brother Wilhelm Adolf.

Connected to Barmstedt 

 Johann Hinrich Klapmeyer (around 1690-1757), organ builder, built in 1717 the organ of the Heiligen-Geist-Kirche
 Gottfried Semper (1803-1879), architect, Semper Opera, went here during his childhood some years to school
 Joachim Gabor (1929-2013), founder of the Women's Shoe manufacturer Gabor in Barmstedt

References

Pinneberg (district)